Ulysses is one Latinized version of Odysseus. The name was made more famous in modern times by the American Civil War hero and eighteenth president of the United States, Ulysses S. Grant, by James Joyce's novel Ulysses, and the film of the same name.

People named Ulysses
In the United States "Ulysses" is perhaps best known as the name of Ulysses S. Grant (1822–1885), the U.S. Army general and President of the United States. Many Americans born during or after the Civil War were named in his honour.

Other people with the name "Ulysses" include:

In arts and entertainment
 Ulysses Cuadra (born 1987), American actor
 Ulysses Davis (1872–1924), American film director
 Ulysses Davis (artist) (1913–1990), American artist
 Ulysses Dove (1947–1996), American choreographer
 Ulysses Kay (1917–1995), American composer
 Ulysses Livingston (1912–1988), American musician
 Ulysses Owens (born 1982), American musician
 Ulysses J. Lincoln Peoples (1865–?), American architect
 Ulysses Ricci (1888–1960), American sculptor
 Ulysses "Slow Kid" Thompson (1888–1990), American entertainer
 Ulysses Kae Williams (1921–1987), American radio personality

In law, politics, and military
 Ulysses N. Arnett (1820–1880), American politician in West Virginia
 Ulysses Burgh, 2nd Baron Downes (1788–1864), British Army general
 Ulysses G. Buzzard (1865–1939), U.S. Army soldier
 Ulysses Currie (1937–2019), American politician from Maryland
 Ulysses G. Denman (1866–1962), American politician from Ohio
 Ulysses Doubleday (general) (1824–1893), U.S. Army general
 Ulysses F. Doubleday (1792–1866), American politician from New York
 Ulysses S. Grant (1822–1885), the 18th President of the United States
 Ulysses S. Grant Jr. (1852–1929), American lawyer
 Ulysses S. Grant III (1881–1968), U.S. Army general
 Ulysses Grant-Smith (1870–1959), American diplomat
 Ulysses Samuel Guyer (1868–1943), American politician from Kansas
 Ulysses Samuel Lesh (1868–1965), American politician from Indiana
 Ulysses Jones, Jr. (1951–2010), American politician from Tennessee
 Ulysses J. Lupien (1883–1965), American local government official
 Ulysses G. McAlexander (1864–1936), U.S. Army general
 Ulysses Mercur (1818–1887), American politician from Pennsylvania
 Ulysses Shelton (1917–1981), American politician from Pennsylvania
 Ulysses S. Webb (1864–1947), American politician from California

In science and medicine
 Ulysses Grant Bourne (1873–1956), American physician
 Ulysses Grant Dailey (1885–1961), American surgeon
 Ulysses S. Grant IV (1893–1977), American geologist
 Ulysses Prentiss Hedrick (1870–1951), American botanist
 Ulysses G. Weatherly (1865–1940), American sociologist

In sport 
 Ulysses Brown (1920–1942), American baseball player
 Ulysses Coumier (c. 1905–?), American football player
 Ulysses Curtis (1926–2013), Canadian football player
 Ulysses Gomez (born 1983), Mexican-American mixed martial arts fighter
 Ulysses Lawrence (born 1954), Antiguan cricketer
 Ulysses Llanez (born 2001), American soccer player
 Ulysses S. McPherson, American football coach
 Ulysses Norris (born 1957), American footballer player
 Ulysses Reed (born 1959), American basketball player

Other people
 Ulysses Burgh (1632–1692), Irish Anglican bishop
 Ulysses Grant Groff (1865–1950), American philanthropist
 Ulysses Grant Baker Pierce (1865–1943), American Unitarian minister

Fictional characters
Odysseus, the main character of Homer's Odyssey, known as Ulysses in Latin
Ulysses Bloodstone, Marvel Comics character
Ulysses Moore, character in the book series of the same name
Ulysses Paxton, character in The Master Mind of Mars, by Edgar Rice Burroughs
Ulysses Klaue, Marvel Comics character
Ulysses, antagonist of Fallout: New Vegas's Lonesome Road DLC

See also
Ulises, the Spanish version of the name
Ulisses, the Portuguese version of the name

References

Masculine given names
Given names of Greek language origin
Latin masculine given names
English masculine given names